Division 1 or Division One may refer to:

Association football 
 Azadegan League, the second-tier professional football league in Iran
 Brisbane Premier League Division 1, the second-tier professional football league in Brisbane, Queensland, Australia
 Danish 1st Division, of the Danish football league system
 Division 1 (Swedish football), now Ettan Football, the third-tier football league in Sweden
 Football League First Division, the former top division of the English football league system
 Hong Kong First Division League, the second-tier football league in Hong Kong
 I liga, the second-tier football league in Poland
 J1 League, Japan Professional Football League
 League of Ireland First Division, the top-flight division of the Irish football league system
 Ligue 1, the top-flight division of the football league system in France
 The Saudi First Division League, the second-tier football league in Saudi Arabia
 Scottish Football League First Division, the now-defunct second-tier football league in Scotland from 1975 to 2013
 Thai Division 1 League, the second-tier football league in Thailand
 Victorian State League Division 1, the second-tier soccer league in Victoria, Australia
 Welsh Football League Division One, the former top division of the Welsh football league system

Other sports
 Division 1 (bandy), the third tier of the Swedish bandy league system
 Division 1 (Swedish women's football)
 Division I (NJCAA)
 Division I (US bandy), the top level bandy league in the United States
 Division Élite, a French baseball league
 First division (baseball), a baseball term
 FFHG Division 1, the second tier of French men's ice hockey 
 Cyprus Basketball Division 1
 Hockeyettan, formerly Division 1, the third tier of ice hockey in Sweden, previously the first tier from 1944 to 1975
 LFH Division 1, the top tier of French women's team handball 
 LNH Division 1, the top tier of French men's team handball 
 NCAA Division I, the highest level of intercollegiate athletics in the U.S.
 Women's Flat Track Derby Association Division 1, the highest level of competition in women's flat track roller derby

See also
 Football League One
 Primera división (disambiguation)
 1st Division (disambiguation)
 A Division (disambiguation)
 Division II (disambiguation)

de:Division 1